The 2017 Overton's 200 was the 17th stock car race of the 2017 NASCAR Xfinity Series season and the 28th iteration of the event. The race was held on Saturday, July 15, 2017, in Loudon, New Hampshire, at New Hampshire Motor Speedway a 1.058 miles (1.703 km) permanent, oval-shaped, low-banked racetrack. The race took the scheduled 200 laps to complete. At race's end, Kyle Busch, driving for Joe Gibbs Racing, would dominate late in the race to win his 89th career NASCAR Xfinity Series win and his third of the season. To fill out the podium, Ryan Preece of Joe Gibbs Racing and William Byron of JR Motorsports would finish second and third, respectively.

Background 
The race was held at New Hampshire Motor Speedway, which is a  oval speedway located in Loudon, New Hampshire, which has hosted NASCAR racing annually since 1990, as well as the longest-running motorcycle race in North America, the Loudon Classic. Nicknamed "The Magic Mile", the speedway is often converted into a  road course, which includes much of the oval.

The track was originally the site of Bryar Motorsports Park before being purchased and redeveloped by Bob Bahre. The track is currently one of eight major NASCAR tracks owned and operated by Speedway Motorsports.

Entry list 

 (R) denotes rookie driver.
 (i) denotes driver who is ineligible for series driver points.

Practice

First practice 
The first practice session was held on Friday, July 14, at 1:00 PM EST. The session would last for 55 minutes.

Second and final practice 
The final practice session, sometimes referred to as Happy Hour, was held on Friday, July 14, at 3:00 PM EST. The session would last for 20 minutes due to inclement weather.

Qualifying 
Qualifying was held on Saturday, July 15, at 11:05 AM EST. Since New Hampshire Motor Speedway is under  in length, the qualifying system was a multi-car system that included three rounds. The first round was 15 minutes, where every driver would be able to set a lap within the 15 minutes. Then, the second round would consist of the fastest 24 cars in Round 1, and drivers would have 10 minutes to set a lap. Round 3 consisted of the fastest 12 drivers from Round 2, and the drivers would have 5 minutes to set a time. Whoever was fastest in Round 3 would win the pole.

No drivers would fail to qualify.

Full qualifying results

Race results 
Stage 1 Laps: 45

Stage 2 Laps: 45

Stage 3 Laps: 110

Standings after the race 

Drivers' Championship standings

Note: Only the first 12 positions are included for the driver standings.

References 

2017 NASCAR Xfinity Series
NASCAR races at New Hampshire Motor Speedway
July 2017 sports events in the United States
2017 in sports in New Hampshire